Nochad is a village in Kozhikode district in the state of Kerala, India.

Demographics 
 India census, Nochad had a population of 25272 with 12437 males and 12835 females.

Location
It is well connected with  Koyilandy, Meppayyur, Ulliyeri and Perambra, the main towns of the region, by road. The Kozhikode to Kannur State Highway passes through Velliyur, which is 2 km from Nochad. By air the nearest airport is Calicut International Airport and the nearest railway station is Koyilandy.

Economy
People here are mainly engaged in agriculture mainly paddy, banana and tapioca. Coconut farming also is a main source of income. Many people from Nochad work abroad and that is an alternate mode of income.

Educational institutions
The biggest school here is Nochad Higher Secondary School.

Villages and suburbs
Chenoli
Ancham Peedika
Chathoth Thazhe
Muliyangal
Velliyoor
Valiacode
Chalikkara
Kaithakkal

Transportation
Nochad village connects to other parts of India through Koyilandy town.  The nearest airports are at Kannur and Kozhikode.  The nearest railway station is at Koyiandy.  The national highway no.66 passes through Koyilandy and the northern stretch connects to Mangalore, Goa and Mumbai.  The southern stretch connects to Cochin and Trivandrum.  The eastern National Highway No.54 going through Kuttiady connects to Mananthavady, Mysore and Bangalore.

Places of interest
Chenoli mosque
Kalpathoor temple
Nochad temple
Sree Muthappan Temple, Valoor
Podiyath tharavadu
Ellathu para temple, Chenoli
Kalpathoor Vayanasala 
velliyoor bridge
Keloth Ayyappa Temple, Nochad
Nochad Narasimha Temple, Nochad

See also
 Perambra
 Moodadi
 Chengottukavu
 Naduvannur
 Arikkulam
 Thikkodi
 Chemancheri
 Kappad
 Atholi
 Ulliyeri
 Cheekilode
 Koyilandy

References 

Koyilandy area